The 2012 Thespa Kusatsu season is Thespa Kusatsu's eighth season in J.League Division 2 since promotion from the Japan Football League in 2005.

Competitions

J League

League table

Matches

References

Thespa Kusatsu
Thespakusatsu Gunma seasons